Charles William Belden (December 7, 1900 – November 1976)  was an American football player. He played for the Duluth Eskimos and Chicago Cardinals. He played college football for Saint Mary's College of California.

References

1900 births
American football quarterbacks
Duluth Eskimos players
Chicago Cardinals players
Saint Mary's Gaels football players
1976 deaths